The Women's 100 metre butterfly S13 event at the 2020 Paralympic Games took place on 25 August 2021 at the Tokyo Aquatics Centre.

Heats

The swimmers with the top eight times, regardless of heat, advanced to the final.

Final

References

Swimming at the 2020 Summer Paralympics
2021 in women's swimming